A phospholipase is an enzyme that hydrolyzes phospholipids into fatty acids and other lipophilic substances. Acids trigger the release of bound calcium from cellular stores and the consequent increase in free cytosolic Ca2+, an essential step in calcium signaling to regulate intracellular processes. There are four major classes, termed A, B, C, and D, which are distinguished by the type of reaction which they catalyze:

Phospholipase A
Phospholipase A1 – cleaves the sn-1 acyl chain (where sn refers to stereospecific numbering).
Phospholipase A2 – cleaves the sn-2 acyl chain, releasing arachidonic acid.
Phospholipase B – cleaves both sn-1 and sn-2 acyl chains; this enzyme is also known as a lysophospholipase.
Phospholipase C – cleaves before the phosphate, releasing diacylglycerol and a phosphate-containing head group. PLCs play a central role in signal transduction, releasing the second messenger inositol triphosphate.
Phospholipase D – cleaves after the phosphate, releasing phosphatidic acid and an alcohol.

Types C and D are considered phosphodiesterases.

Endothelial lipase is primarily a phospholipase.

Phospholipase A2 acts on the intact lecithin molecule and hydrolyzes the fatty acid esterified to the second carbon atom. The resulting products are lysolecithin and a fatty acid. Phospholipase A2 is an enzyme present in the venom of bees, blennies and viper snakes.

See also
Patatin-like phospholipase
Infantile neuroaxonal dystrophy

References

Further reading
 Tappia, Paramjit S. & Dhalla, Naranjan S. (Editors): Phospholipases in Health and Disease. Springer, 2014.  [Print];  [eBook]

External links

Peripheral membrane proteins
Cell signaling
Hydrolases